The Hardyston Township School District is a community public school district that serves students in pre-kindergarten through eighth grade from Hardyston Township, in Sussex County, New Jersey, United States.

As of the 2020–21 school year, the district, comprised of two schools, had an enrollment of 593 students and 57.0 classroom teachers (on an FTE basis), for a student–teacher ratio of 10.4:1.

The district is classified by the New Jersey Department of Education as being in District Factor Group "FG", the fourth-highest of eight groupings. District Factor Groups organize districts statewide to allow comparison by common socioeconomic characteristics of the local districts. From lowest socioeconomic status to highest, the categories are A, B, CD, DE, FG, GH, I and J.

For ninth though twelfth grades, students attend Wallkill Valley Regional High School which consists of Franklin Borough, Hamburg Borough and Ogdensburg Borough, and is part of the Wallkill Valley Regional High School District. As of the 2020–21 school year, the high school had an enrollment of 590 students and 52.2 classroom teachers (on an FTE basis), for a student–teacher ratio of 11.3:1.

Schools
Schools in the district (with 2020–21 enrollment data from the National Center for Education Statistics) are:
Elementary school
Hardyston Township School with 318 students in grades PreK-5
Jennifer Cimaglia, Principal
Middle school
Hardyston Middle School with 274 students in grades 6-8
Robert Demeter, Vice Principal

Administration
Core members of the district's administration are:
Michael Ryder, Superintendent
Richard Rennie, Business Administrator / Board Secretary

Board of education
The district's board of education, comprised of nine members, sets policy and oversees the fiscal and educational operation of the district through its administration. As a Type II school district, the board's trustees are elected directly by voters to serve three-year terms of office on a staggered basis, with three seats up for election each year held (since 2012) as part of the November general election. The board appoints a superintendent to oversee the district's day-to-day operations and a business administrator to supervise the business functions of the district.

References

External links
Hardyston Township School District

Data for Hardyston Township Public School, National Center for Education Statistics

Hardyston Township, New Jersey
New Jersey District Factor Group FG
School districts in Sussex County, New Jersey